The 2003 Kenya Puisne Judges Tribunal was a Tribunal setup on 10 December 2003 to investigate the Conduct Of Puisne Judges of the High Court of Kenya following the 2003 Ringera Judiciary Report.

Terms of Reference
President Mwai Kibaki established a tribunal which was to investigate the conduct the following judges:
 Daniel K.S. Aganyanya
 Tom Mbaluto
 A. Mbogholi Msagha
 Roselyne Nambuye
 J.V Odero Juma 
 J. Kasanga Mulwa

The tribunal was to investigate the allegations that the said Puisne Judges have been involved in corruption, unethical practices and absence of integrity in the performance of the functions of their office a report with recommendations to the President.

In the meantime, the Judges were to stand suspended from exercising the functions of their office.

Membership
The tribunal consisted of:
 Justice (Rtd) Abdul Majid Cockar,
 Justice John Mwera
 Justice Leonard Njagi
 Justice Daniel Musinga
 Justice Isaack Lenaola

See also
 Court of Appeal of Kenya
 High Court of Kenya

References

Judiciary of Kenya
2003 in Kenya